Grebbestad Bryggeri is a brewery in the town Grebbestad on the Swedish west coast. It is a relatively small and local brewery producing their products mainly for the use of the local county Bohuslän. Their main production are in two lager beers called Koster and Granit, but other brews occur as well.

Beers, the Grebbestad brand
Koster is a lager beer with 3,5% alcohol and is available for purchase mostly in local supermarkets. The name comes from the local islands of Koster.

Granit (Swedish for Granite) is a lager beer . It is sold in local supermarkets at 3,5% alcohol and at 4,8% at Systembolaget. The name is inspired by the cliffs of Bohuslän, where Grebbestad lies, which are made of granite. For Christmas a special Christmas beer is made, just like Swedish brewer tradition says. The beer is like most other Swedish Christmas brews, a porter-like dark lager.

Beers produced for others
Grebbestad produces some beers on behalf of the Gothenburg brewery Göteborgs Nya Bryggeri.

Grebbestad also produces the beer Alberget 4A on behalf of Djurgårdshjälpen. This beer is not part of the Grebbestad brand but is sold to support the sports club Djurgårdens IF.

References

Breweries in Sweden
Companies based in Västra Götaland County